James Price Hudgens (August 24, 1902 - August 25, 1955) was a Major League Baseball first baseman. He played parts of three seasons in the majors:  for the St. Louis Cardinals and - for the Cincinnati Reds.

Sources

Major League Baseball first basemen
St. Louis Cardinals players
Cincinnati Reds players
Fairbury Jeffersons players
Fort Smith Twins players
Marshall Indians players
Houston Buffaloes players
Minneapolis Millers (baseball) players
Seattle Indians players
Memphis Chickasaws players
Knoxville Smokies players
Greenville Spinners players
Charlotte Hornets (baseball) players
Baseball players from Missouri
1902 births
1955 deaths
People from Phelps County, Missouri